The 2020 Emergence was a professional wrestling event produced by Impact Wrestling. The event took place behind closed doors at Skyway Studios in Nashville, Tennessee on August 18 and 25, 2020 as a two-part special episode for the company's weekly television program, Impact!.

The event comprised a total of 10 matches, with five occurring on the August 18 broadcast and five on August 25. In the main event of the August 18 broadcast, The Motor City Machine Guns (Alex Shelley and Chris Sabin) defeated The North (Ethan Page and Josh Alexander) to retain the Impact World Tag Team Championship, while in the main event of the August 25 broadcast, Deonna Purrazzo defeated Jordynne Grace by two falls to one in the first Knockouts 30-minute Iron Woman match to retain the Impact Knockouts Championship.

Production

Background 

On August 4, 2020, Impact Wrestling announced that Emergence will be a two night special of the company's television programme, Impact!, that will be broadcast on AXS TV on August 18 and 25, 2020.

Storylines 
The matches are made from scripted storylines, where wrestlers portray heroes, villains, or less distinguishable characters in scripted events that build tension and culminate in a wrestling match or series of matches. Results are predetermined by Impact Wrestling writers, while storylines are produced on their weekly television program, Impact!.

On the July 21 episode of Impact!, The Motor City Machine Guns (Alex Shelley and Chris Sabin) defeated The North (Ethan Page and Josh Alexander) to win the Impact World Tag Team Championship for the second time. On the August 4 episode of Impact!, The North confronted The Motor City Machine Guns to announce their cashing in their rematch clause for the tag titles at Emergence, with Impact announcing it will take place on night one.

At Slammiversary, Deonna Purrazzo defeated Jordynne Grace by submission to win the Impact Knockouts Championship. On the July 28 episode of Impact!, Purrazzo defeated Kimber Lee in a singles match by submission, and after the match, Grace attacked Purrazzo whilst her arm was in a sling, as a result of muscle damaged caused by the armbar submission that made Grace submit to Purrazzo at Slammiversary, causing Purrazzo to flee from the ring. On August 12, it was announced that Purrazzo will defend the title against Grace on night two of Emergence.

At Slammiversary, Chris Bey defeated Willie Mack to win the Impact X Division Championship. The following weeks saw Rohit Raju align himself with Bey and stir up animosity between him and TJP. On the August 11 episode of Impact!, Raju convinced Bey to give both him and TJP an X Division title shot in a three-way match at Emergence, with Impact announcing it will take place on night one.

Results

Notes

References

External links 
impactwrestling.com

2020 American television episodes
2020 in professional wrestling
2020 in Tennessee
2020s American television specials
August 2020 events in the United States
Events postponed due to the COVID-19 pandemic
Professional wrestling in Nashville, Tennessee
Events in Nashville, Tennessee